The Encyclopædia Britannica Eleventh Edition (1910–1911) is a 29-volume reference work, an edition of the Encyclopædia Britannica. It was developed during the encyclopaedia's transition from a British to an American publication. Some of its articles were written by the best-known scholars of the time. This edition of the encyclopaedia, containing 40,000 entries, has entered the public domain and is easily available on the Internet. Its use in modern scholarship and as a reliable source has been deemed problematic due to the outdated nature of some of its content. Modern scholars have deemed some articles as cultural artifacts of the 19th and early 20th centuries.

 Background 

The 1911 eleventh edition was assembled with the management of American publisher Horace Everett Hooper. Hugh Chisholm, who had edited the previous edition, was appointed editor in chief, with Walter Alison Phillips as his principal assistant editor.

Originally, Hooper bought the rights to the 25-volume 9th edition and persuaded the British newspaper The Times to issue its reprint, with eleven additional volumes (35 volumes total) as the tenth edition, which was published in 1902. Hooper's association with The Times ceased in 1909, and he negotiated with the Cambridge University Press to publish the 29-volume eleventh edition. Though it is generally perceived as a quintessentially British work, the eleventh edition had substantial American influences, in not only the increased amount of American and Canadian content, but also the efforts made to make it more popular. American marketing methods also assisted sales. Some 14% of the contributors (214 of 1507) were from North America, and a New York office was established to coordinate their work.

The initials of the encyclopaedia's contributors appear at the end of selected articles or at the end of a section in the case of longer articles, such as that on China, and a key is given in each volume to these initials.  Some articles were written by the best-known scholars of the time, such as Edmund Gosse, J. B. Bury, Algernon Charles Swinburne, John Muir, Peter Kropotkin, T. H. Huxley, James Hopwood Jeans and William Michael Rossetti. Among the then lesser-known contributors were some who would later become distinguished, such as Ernest Rutherford and Bertrand Russell. Many articles were carried over from the 9th edition, some with minimal updating. Some of the book-length articles were divided into smaller parts for easier reference, yet others much abridged.  The best-known authors generally contributed only a single article or part of an article. Most of the work was done by journalists, British Museum scholars and other scholars. The 1911 edition was the first edition of the encyclopaedia to include more than just a handful of female contributors, with 34 women contributing articles to the edition.

The eleventh edition introduced a number of changes of the format of the Britannica. It was the first to be published complete, instead of the previous method of volumes being released as they were ready. The print type was kept in galley proofs and subject to continual updating until publication. It was the first edition of Britannica to be issued with a comprehensive index volume in which was added a categorical index, where like topics were listed. It was the first not to include long treatise-length articles. Even though the overall length of the work was about the same as that of its predecessor, the number of articles had increased from 17,000 to 40,000. It was also the first edition of Britannica to include biographies of living people. Sixteen maps of the famous 9th edition of Stielers Handatlas were exclusively translated to English, converted to imperial units, printed in Gotha, Germany, by Justus Perthes and became part this edition. Later editions only included Perthes' maps as low quality reproductions.

According to Coleman and Simmons, the content of the encyclopaedia was distributed as follows:

Hooper sold the rights to Sears, Roebuck and Company of Chicago in 1920, completing the Britannicas transition to becoming a substantially American publication. In 1922, an additional three volumes (also edited by Hugh Chisholm) were published, covering the events of the intervening years, including World War I. These, together with a reprint of the eleventh edition, formed the twelfth edition of the work. A similar thirteenth edition, consisting of three volumes plus a reprint of the twelfth edition, was published in 1926. The London editor was J.L. Garvin, as Chisholm had died. The twelfth and thirteenth editions were closely related to the eleventh edition and shared much of the same content. However, it became increasingly apparent that a more thorough update of the work was required.

The fourteenth edition, published in 1929, was considerably revised, with much text eliminated or abridged to make room for new topics.  Nevertheless, the eleventh edition was the basis of every later version of the Encyclopædia Britannica until the completely new fifteenth edition was published in 1974, using modern information presentation.

The eleventh edition's articles are still of value and interest to modern readers and scholars, especially as a cultural artifact: the British Empire was at its maximum, imperialism was largely unchallenged, much of the world was still ruled by monarchs, and the tumultuous world wars were still in the future. They are an invaluable resource for topics omitted from modern encyclopaedias, particularly for biography and the history of science and technology. As a literary text, the encyclopaedia has value as an example of early 20th-century prose. For example, it employs literary devices, such as pathetic fallacy (attribution of human-like traits to impersonal forces or inanimate objects), which are not as common in modern reference texts.

 Reviews 

In 1917, using the pseudonym of S. S. Van Dine, the US art critic and author Willard Huntington Wright published Misinforming a Nation, a 200+ page criticism of inaccuracies and biases of the Encyclopædia Britannica eleventh edition. Wright claimed that Britannica was "characterized by misstatements, inexcusable omissions, rabid and patriotic prejudices, personal animosities, blatant errors of fact, scholastic ignorance, gross neglect of non-British culture, an astounding egotism, and an undisguised contempt for American progress".

Amos Urban Shirk, known for having read the eleventh and fourteenth editions in their entirety, said he found the fourteenth edition to be a "big improvement" over the eleventh, stating that "most of the material had been completely rewritten".

Robert Collison, in Encyclopaedias: Their History Throughout The Ages (1966), wrote of the eleventh edition that it "was probably the finest edition of the Britannica ever issued, and it ranks with the Enciclopedia Italiana and the Espasa as one of the three greatest encyclopaedias. It was the last edition to be produced almost in its entirety in Britain, and its position in time as a summary of the world's knowledge just before the outbreak of World War I is particularly valuable".

Sir Kenneth Clark, in Another Part of the Wood (1974), wrote of the eleventh edition, "One leaps from one subject to another, fascinated as much by the play of mind and the idiosyncrasies of their authors as by the facts and dates. It must be the last encyclopaedia in the tradition of Diderot which assumes that information can be made memorable only when it is slightly coloured by prejudice. When T. S. Eliot wrote 'Soul curled up on the window seat reading the Encyclopædia Britannica,' he was certainly thinking of the eleventh edition." (Clark refers to Eliot's 1929 poem "Animula".) It was one of Jorge Luis Borges's favourite works, and was a source of information and enjoyment for his entire working life.

In 1912, mathematician L. C. Karpinski criticised the eleventh edition for inaccuracies in articles on the history of mathematics, none of which had been written by specialists.

English writer and former priest Joseph McCabe claimed in Lies and Fallacies of the Encyclopædia Britannica (1947) that Britannica was censored under pressure from the Roman Catholic Church after the 11th edition. Initially, the eleventh edition received criticism from members of the Roman Catholic Church, who accused it of misrepresenting and being biased against Catholics. The most "vociferous" American Catholic critics of the eleventh edition were editors of the Christian magazine America.

Authorities ranging from Virginia Woolf to professors criticised the 11th edition for having bourgeois and old-fashioned opinions on art, literature, and social sciences. A contemporary Cornell professor, Edward B. Titchener, wrote in 1912, "the new Britannica does not reproduce the psychological atmosphere of its day and generation... Despite the halo of authority, and despite the scrutiny of the staff, the great bulk of the secondary articles in general psychology ... are not adapted to the requirements of the intelligent reader".

In an April 2012 article, Nate Pederson of The Guardian said that the eleventh edition represented "a peak of colonial optimism before the slaughter of war" and that the edition "has acquired an almost mythic reputation among collectors".

Critics have charged several editions with racism,Citing from the article on "Negro" and discussing the consequences of views such as those stated there: Brooks, Roy L., editor. "Redress for Racism?" When Sorry Isn't Enough: The Controversy Over Apologies and Reparations for Human Injustice, NYU Press, 1999, pp. 395–398. . Accessed August 17, 2020. sexism, and antisemitism. The eleventh edition characterises the Ku Klux Klan as protecting the white race and restoring order to the American South after the American Civil War, citing the need to "control the negro", and "the frequent occurrence of the crime of rape by negro men upon white women". Similarly, the "Civilization" article argues for eugenics, stating that it is irrational to "propagate low orders of intelligence, to feed the ranks of paupers, defectives and criminals ... which to-day constitute so threatening an obstacle to racial progress". The eleventh edition has no biography of Marie Curie, despite her winning of the Nobel Prize in Physics in 1903 and the Nobel Prize in Chemistry in 1911, although she is mentioned briefly under the biography of her husband Pierre Curie. The Britannica employed a large female editorial staff that wrote hundreds of articles for which they were not given credit.

 Public domain 
The 1911 edition is no longer restricted by copyright, and it is therefore freely available in several more modern forms. While it may once have been a reliable description of the academic consensus of its time, many modern readers find fault with the Encyclopedia for several major errors, ethnocentric and racist remarks, and other issues:

 Contemporary opinions of race and ethnicity are included in the Encyclopædias articles. For example, the entry for "Negro" states, "Mentally the negro is inferior to the white... the arrest or even deterioration of mental development [after adolescence] is no doubt very largely  after puberty sexual matters take the first place in the negro's life and thoughts." The article about the American Revolutionary War attributes the success of the United States in part to "a population mainly of good English blood and instincts".
 Many articles are now outdated factually, in particular those concerning science, technology, international and municipal law, and medicine. For example, the article on the vitamin deficiency disease beriberi speculates that it is caused by a fungus, vitamins not having been discovered at the time. Articles about geographic places mention rail connections and ferry stops in towns that no longer employ such transport (though this in itself can be useful for those looking for historical information).
 Even where the facts might still be accurate, new information, theories and perspectives developed since 1911 have substantially changed the way the same facts might be interpreted. For example, the modern interpretation of the history of the Visigoths is now very different from that of 1911; readers of the eleventh edition who want to know about the social customs and political life of the tribe and its warriors are told to look up the entry for their king, Alaric I.

The eleventh edition of Encyclopædia Britannica has become a commonly quoted source, both because of the reputation of the Britannica and because it is now in the public domain and has been made available on the Internet. It has been used as a source by many modern projects, including Wikipedia and the Project Gutenberg Encyclopedia.

 Project Gutenberg Encyclopedia 
The Project Gutenberg Encyclopedia is the eleventh edition of the Encyclopædia Britannica, renamed to address Britannica's trademark concerns. Project Gutenberg's offerings are summarized below in the External links section and include text and graphics. , Distributed Proofreaders are working on producing a complete electronic edition of the 1911 Encyclopædia Britannica.

See also 
 Catholic Encyclopedia
 New American Cyclopedia

References

Further reading
 Boyles, Denis. Everything Explained That Is Explainable: On the Creation of the Encyclopaedia Britannica's Celebrated Eleventh Edition, 1910–1911 (2016), online review

External links

Free, public-domain sources for 1911 Encyclopædia Britannica text 
 via HathiTrust
 :s:1911 Encyclopædia Britannica/Prefatory Note to the Encyclopædia Britannica 11th ed. dated Cambridge November 1, 1910: with separate volumes below in several formats on the Internet Archive:

 Project Gutenberg Encyclopedia:

 Flash reader (Empanel) with full-page scans

Other sources for 1911 Encyclopædia Britannica text 
  – unedited, html version, from scan/ocr of the original text, with interactive alphabetical index, and Google translation into Spanish, Chinese, French, German, Russian, Hindi, Arabic and Portuguese.
  – "Containing 35,820 entries cross-referenced and cross-linked to other resources on StudyLight.org". "Copyright Statement[:] these [EB 1911] files are public domain".
 The Encyclopaedia Britannica: A Dictionary of Arts, Sciences, Literature and General Information (11th edition) at the Online Books Page of the University of Pennsylvania.
 The Encyclopaedia Britannica in Numerical Recipes bookreader format.
The preceding links adopt the spellings used in the target.

11
1911 non-fiction books
Britannica, 1911 Encyclopaedia
1911 in the United Kingdom
20th-century encyclopedias